First Christian Church Parsonage is a historic church parsonage at 608 N. Penelope Street in Belton, Texas.

It was built in 1900 and added to the National Register of Historic Places in 1990.

See also

National Register of Historic Places listings in Bell County, Texas

References

Churches in Texas
Properties of religious function on the National Register of Historic Places in Texas
Queen Anne architecture in Texas
Italianate architecture in Texas
Churches completed in 1900
Houses in Bell County, Texas
Clergy houses in the United States
National Register of Historic Places in Bell County, Texas
Italianate church buildings in the United States